Bilinga may refer to:
Bilinga, Queensland,  a suburb of the Gold Coast, Queensland
Bilinga, Republic of the Congo, a village
Bilinga (wood), a tropical hardwood